A by-election was held for the New South Wales Legislative Assembly electorate of Armidale on 11 February 1950 because of the resignation of David Drummond to successfully contest the federal seat of New England at the 1949 election.

Dates

Result

David Drummond resigned to successfully contest the 1949 election for New England.

See also
Electoral results for the district of Armidale
List of New South Wales state by-elections

References

1950 elections in Australia
New South Wales state by-elections
1950s in New South Wales